The International Challenger Quanzhou was a professional tennis tournament played on hard courts. It was part of the ATP Challenger Tour. It was held in Quanzhou, China in 2017.

Past finals

Singles

Doubles

References

ATP Challenger Tour
Hard court tennis tournaments
Tennis tournaments in China